A Woman Called Golda is a 1982 American made-for-television film biopic of Israeli Prime Minister Golda Meir directed by Alan Gibson and starring Ingrid Bergman. It also features Ned Beatty, Franklin Cover, Judy Davis, Anne Jackson, Robert Loggia, Leonard Nimoy, and Jack Thompson.

A Woman Called Golda was produced by Paramount Domestic Television for syndication and was distributed by Operation Prime Time. The film premiered on April 26, 1982.

Plot

In 1977, Golda Meir returns to her old school in Milwaukee, Wisconsin where she tells the students her life story. She recounts her early years in Russia, and how her family emigrated to America to avoid the persecution of Jews throughout Europe. As a young woman, Golda dreams of fighting for a country for all Jews of the world. She marries Morris Meyerson, and they eventually move to Palestine to work in a kibbutz, although they soon end up leaving, much to Golda's disappointment. They move to Jerusalem and have two children, but Golda's tremendous ambition soon drives her and Morris apart, although they remain married until his death in 1951.

Golda is elected Prime Minister of Israel in 1969, resigning after the Yom Kippur War in 1974.

Cast
 Ingrid Bergman as Golda Meir
 Ned Beatty as Senator Durward 
 Franklin Cover as Hubert Humphrey 
 Judy Davis as Young Golda 
 Anne Jackson as Lou Kaddar 
 Robert Loggia as Anwar Sadat 
 Leonard Nimoy as Morris Meyerson 
 Jack Thompson as Ariel 
 Anthony Bate as Sir Stuart Ross 
 Ron Berglas as Stampler 
 Bruce Boa as Mr. Macy 
 David de Keyser as David Ben-Gurion 
 Barry Foster as Major Orde Wingate
 Nigel Hawthorne as King Abdullah
 Yossi Graber as Moshe Dayan
 Oded Teomi as David Elazar
 David Joseph Vincent as Choir Boy

Reception
At the 34th Primetime Emmy Awards, the film received seven Emmy nominations and won three awards, including the Outstanding Drama Special and Outstanding Lead Actress in a Miniseries or Movie for Ingrid Bergman, which was awarded posthumously (the award was accepted by Bergman's daughter Pia Lindström). Leonard Nimoy received an Emmy nomination for Outstanding Supporting Actor in a Limited Series or a Special as well as Judy Davis (as the young Golda Meir) for Outstanding Supporting Actress in a Limited Series or Special.

The film was also nominated for two Golden Globes and won the award for Best Performance by an Actress for Bergman, again awarded posthumously.

References

External links

1982 films
1982 television films
1980s biographical drama films
American biographical drama films
Biographical films about prime ministers
1980s English-language films
Films directed by Alan Gibson
Films produced by Harve Bennett
Films produced by Gene Corman
Films scored by Michel Legrand
Films set in the 1960s
Films set in the 1970s
Films set in Israel
Films set in Milwaukee
Operation Prime Time
Paramount Pictures films
Primetime Emmy Award for Outstanding Made for Television Movie winners
American political drama films
Cultural depictions of Golda Meir
Cultural depictions of Anwar Sadat
Cultural depictions of David Ben-Gurion
1982 drama films
American drama television films
1980s American films